Mademoiselle n'a pas chanté que le blues is the 2011 compilation album by French singer Patricia Kaas, released in Canada 
on 3 October 2011.

Track listing

References

2011 albums
Patricia Kaas albums